Yr Amgueddfa is a Welsh television series based on the National Museum of Wales.

Plot
It dramatizes the self-destructive decline of a successful lady, a museum director who starts an affair with a young man.

History
Filming of the series began in January 2021, with the first broadcast at the end of May 2021.

In 2022, it was nominated for the BAFTA Cymru.

The second series of Yr Amgueddfa will be based at Carmarthen Museum.

Reception
The drama series has been reviewed by the Wales Arts Review.

Awards
2022: BAFTA Cymru (nomination)

References

External links
 S4C - Yr Amgueddfa

2020s Welsh television series
2021 British television series debuts